Rabbitt were a South African rock band formed in 1972, evolving from a band called The Conglomeration, consisting of members Trevor Rabin, Duncan Faure, Ronnie Robot, and Neil Cloud. Their successes included making it to the top of the South African charts with the hit "Charlie" in 1976.  Rabbitt broke up in 1978.  Rabin later became a member of Yes, and Faure went on to join the Bay City Rollers.

Musicians

line-up - Not to be confused with the Supergroup Rabbitt launched in 1975 (recorded 'Locomotive Breath') single
 Trevor Rabin (born 13 January 1954)
 Errol Friedman
 Francois Roos
 Louis Forer (born 14 May 1949)
 Cedric Samson

Line-up from 1975
 Trevor Rabin: Vocals, lead guitar, keyboards
 Duncan Faure (born 16 December 1956): Vocals, guitars, keyboards
 Ronnie Robot (Ronald Friedman) (born 5 October 1954): Bass guitar
 Neil Cloud (born 3 September 1955): Drums

Albums
Boys Will Be Boys (Jo'Burg Records in South Africa,) (1975)
Tracks:
"Something's Going Wrong with My Baby" (Trevor Rabin) — 4:45
"Savage" (Rabin) — 4:43
"Lifeline" (Patrick van Blerk, Rabin) — 6:00
"Locomotive Breath" (Ian Anderson) — 3:35
"Hard Ride" (Rabin) — 4:05
"Baby's Leaving" (Rabin) — 2:20
"Eventides" (Rabin) — 2:34
"Looking for the Man" (Van Blerk, Rabin) — 4:00
"Death of Tulio" (Rabin) — 0:22
"Charlie" (Van Blerk, Rabin) — 2:35
"Brand New Love"* (Rabin) — 3:38
"Auld Lang Syne"* (Traditional) — 1:18

Bonus tracks on 2006 CD re-issue (Fresh Music)

A Croak and a Grunt in the Night (1977)
Tracks:

1. "T.C. Rabin in D-Minor" (Rabin) (0.24)
2. "I Sleep Alone" (Rabin) (2.52)
3. "'A Croak and a Grunt in the Night" (Rabin/Van Blerk) (2.37)
4. "Everybody's Cheating" (Rabin/Van Blerk) (4.10)
5. "Sugar Pie" (Rabin) (3.22)
6. "Searching" (Rabin) (4.13)
7. "Working for the People" (Rabin/Robot/Faure/Cloud) (4.21)
8. "Pollyman" (Rabin) (2.23)
9. "Schumann" (Trad. arr. Rabin) (0.21)
10. "Hold On to Love" (Rabin/Van Blerk) (4.06)
11. "Dingley's Bookshop" (Faure) (2.10) theme from a TV series
12. "Never Gonna Ruin my Life" (Rabin) (0.56)
13. "Tribal Fence" (MacKay) (3.51) featuring Margaret Singana
14. "Gift of Love" (Rabin/Van Blerk/Robot) (3.44)
15. "Lonely Loner Too" (Faure) (3.35)
16. "Take It Easy" (Rabin) (3.40)
17. "A Love You Song" (Faure) (1.46)

Musicians:

 Trevor Rabin: Vocals, guitars, piano, electric piano, harmonica, tubular bells, string arrangements, producer
 Neil Cloud: Drums, percussion
 Duncan Faure: Vocals, rhythm guitar, organ, piano
 Ronnie Robot: Bass
 Margaret Singana: Guest vocals on "Tribal Fence"
 Patric van Blerk: Producer
 Julian Laxton: Remix engineer
 Peter Thwaites and Greg Cutler: Engineers

Release information:

1976, Jo'Burg Records, TJL 13014
1977, Capricorn (USA/Canada), CP 0190

Rock Rabbitt (1977)
Tracks:

1. "Rush Hour Scores" (Faure) (5:02)
2. "Mr. Muso" (Faure) (5:14)
3. "Love in my Heart" (Faure) (3:40)
4. "Within These Words" (Faure) (3:12)
5. "Rock 'n' Roll, Part I & II" (Faure) (3:38)
6. "Getting Thru to You" (Faure) (4:08)
7. "I've Been Aware" (Faure) (6:16)
8. "Without Her Love" (Faure) (3:19)
9. "Hello and Welcome Home" (Faure) (5:38)
10. "Goodbye and So-Long" (Faure) (2:28)

Musicians:

 Duncan Faure: Vocals, guitars, keyboards
 Ronnie Robot: Bass
 Neil Cloud: Drums

Release information:

1977, JoBurg Records, TJC(X)13025

Revival
Tracks:

1. "Locomotive Breath" (Ian Anderson) (3:35) — from the album Boys Will Be Boys!
2. "Gift of Love" (Rabin/Van Blerk/Robot) (3.44) — from the album A Croak and a Grunt in the Night
3. "Getting Through to You" (Faure) (4:07) — from the album Rock Rabbitt
4. "Hard Ride" (Rabin) (4:10) — from the album Boys Will Be Boys!
5. "Lifeline" (Rabin/Van Blerk) (5:31) — from the album Boys Will Be Boys!
6. "Searching" (Rabin) (4:09) — from the album A Croak and a Grunt in the Night
7. "T.C. Rabin in D-minor" (Rabin) (0:24) — from the album A Croak and a Grunt in the Night
8. "I Sleep Alone" (Rabin) (2:52) — from the album A Croak and a Grunt in the Night
9. "Charlie" (Rabin/Van Blerk) (2:47) — from the album Boys Will Be Boys!
10. "Morning Light" (Faure/Rabin) (3:12) — from the EP Morning Light (1977)
11. "Brand New Love" (Rabin) (3.30) — from the EP single Morning Light (1977)
12. "A Croak and a Grunt in the Night" (Rabin/Van Blerk) (2:37) — from the album A Croak and a Grunt in the Night
13. "Everybody's Cheating" (Rabin/Van Blerk) (4:08) — from the album A Croak and a Grunt in the Night
14. "Hold On to love" (Rabin/Van Blerk) (4:04) — from the album A Croak and a Grunt in the Night
15. "Tribal Fence" (MacKay) (3.51) featuring Margaret Singana — from the album A Croak and a Grunt in the Night

Release information:

1987, PVB Music, PVBR 1007A

The Collection / The Hits
Tracks:

1. "Hard Ride" (Rabin) (4:10) — from the album Boys Will Be Boys!
2. "Charlie" (Rabin/van Blerk) (2:47) — from the album Boys Will Be Boys!
3. "Lonely Loner Too" (Faure) (3:34) — from the album A Croak and a Grunt in the Night
4. "Searching" (Rabin) (4:09) — from the album A Croak and a Grunt in the Night
5. "Dingley's Bookshop" (Faure) (2:11) — from the album A Croak and a Grunt in the Night
6. "Locomotive Breath" (Ian Anderson) (3:35) — from the album Boys Will Be Boys!
7. "Baby's Leaving" (Rabin) (2:23) — from the album Boys Will Be Boys!
8. "Pollyman" (Rabin) (2:22) — from the album A Croak and a Grunt in the Night
9. "T.C. Rabin in D-minor" (Rabin) (0:24) — from the album A Croak and a Grunt in the Night
10. "I Sleep Alone" (Rabin) (2:52) — from the album A Croak and a Grunt in the Night
11. "A Croak and a Grunt in the Night" (Rabin/van Blerk) (2:37) — from the album A Croak and a Grunt in the Night
12. "Morning Light" (Faure/Rabin) (3:12) — from the EP single Morning Light (1977)
13. "Schumann" (Trad. arr. Rabin) (0:24) — from the album A Croak and a Grunt in the Night
14. "Hold On to love" (Rabin/van Blerk) (4:04) — from the album A Croak and a Grunt in the Night
15. "Take It Easy" (Rabin) (3:40) — from the album A Croak and a Grunt in the Night
16. "Lifeline" (Rabin/van Blerk) (5:31) — from the album Boys Will Be Boys!
17. "I Was Eleven" (Faure), listed on cover as When I Was Eleven (3:10) — from the EP single 1972–1978 (1978)
18. "Everybody's Cheating" (Rabin/van Blerk) (4:08) — from the album A Croak and a Grunt in the Night
19. "Savage" (Rabin) (4:43) — from the album Boys Will Be Boys!
20. "Getting Through to You" (Faure) (4:07) — from the album Rock Rabbitt
21. "Auld Lang Syne Rock" (Trad. arr. Rabin) (1:21) — B-side of "Morning Light" single (1977)
22. "A Love You Song" (Faure) (1:43) — from the EP single Morning Light (1977)

Release information:
1992 (as The Collection), ON records, RABCD1
1996 (as The Hits), Gallo, CDRED 602

The Extended Plays (EPs)
Rock 'n' Roll, Volume 2 (4-track EP, 1977) Capricorn, 2206 201 (Brazil)
Something's Going Wrong With My Baby
Life Line
Locomotive Breath
Eventides
Morning Light (4-track EP, 1977) JoBurg Records, TJS57
Morning Light
A Love You Song
Brand New Love
When You're Without Her
1972–1978 Limited Souvenir Edition (4-track EP, 1978) JoBurg Records, TJM73
Rock 'N Roll Part One & Two
I Was Eleven
Locomotive Breath
Goodbye And So-Long

The Singles
Locomotive Breath [3.00] (Ian Anderson, prod. Patric van Blerk, arr. Fransua Roos) / And The Planets Danced
(1972) MAP, MP.513 Springbok No. 18 in January 1973
Backdoor of my Heart / Share the Loving Things
(1973) JoBurg Records
Hallelujah Sunrise / Hidden Feelings
(1973) JoBurg Records
Yesterday's Papers / B-side unknown
(1974) JoBurg Records
Charlie / Looking for the Man
(1976) JoBurg Records, TJS35 Springbok No. 14 in June 1976
Hard Ride / Baby's Leaving
(1976) JoBurg Records, TJS46
Hold on to Love / Working for the People
(1976) JoBurg Records, TJS49
Sugar Pie / Dingley's Bookshop
(1976) JoBurg Records, TJS51
Eventides / Charlie
(1977) Victor, VIP-2526 (Japan)
Everybody's Cheating / Gift of Love
(1977) Victor, VIP-2561 (Japan)
Hold on to Love / Working for the People
(1977) Capricorn, CPS 0281 (USA)
Morning Light / Auld Lang Syne Rock
(1977) JoBurg Records, TJS57 Springbok No. 15 in September 1977
Gettin' Thru to You (Teenage Love) / Hello and Welcome Home
(1977) JoBurg Records, TJS64 Springbok No. 15 in December 1977

References

External links
M-Net's Carte Blanche profile "Rabbitt Rules"
Dutch Rabbitt Fan Site
Rabbitt at the South African Rock Encyclopedia
Rabbitt Fan Site

Musical groups established in 1972
Musical groups disestablished in 1978
South African rock music groups
Capricorn Records artists